Iga Świątek defeated Donna Vekić in the final, 6–3, 3–6, 6–0 to win the women's singles tennis title at the 2022 San Diego Open. It was her eighth title of the 2022 season. By winning the title, Świątek became the first player since Serena Williams in 2013 to win more than 10,000 ranking points in a single season.

This was the first WTA Tour-level event to be held in the San Diego area since 2013.

Seeds
The top four seeds received a bye into the second round.

Draw

Finals

Top half

Bottom half

Qualifying

Seeds

Qualifiers

Lucky losers

Qualifying draw

First qualifier

Second qualifier

Third qualifier

Fourth qualifier

Fifth qualifier

Sixth qualifier

References

External links 
Qualifying draw
Main draw

San Diego Open